In mathematics, an unary operation is an operation with only one operand, i.e. a single input. This is in contrast to binary operations, which use two operands. An example is any function , where  is a set.

Common notations are prefix notation (e.g. ¬, −), postfix notation (e.g. factorial ), functional notation (e.g.  or ), and superscripts (e.g. transpose ). Other notations exist as well, for example, in the case of the square root, a horizontal bar extending the square root sign over the argument can indicate the extent of the argument.

Examples

Absolute Value 
The operation absolute value is a unary operation.  The absolute value of a number is its distance from zero.

| 3 | = 3

| -3 | = 3

| 0 | = 0

Opposite of 
We find the opposite of a single number.

- (3) = - 3

- ( -3) = 3

Unary negative and positive
As unary operations have only one operand they are evaluated before other operations containing them. Here is an example using negation:

3 − −2

Here, the first '−' represents the binary subtraction operation, while the second '−' represents the unary negation of the 2 (or '−2' could be taken to mean the integer −2). Therefore, the expression is equal to:

3 − (−2) = 5

Technically, there is also a unary + operation but it is not needed since we assume an unsigned value to be positive:

+2 = 2

The unary + operation does not change the sign of a negative operation:

+(−2) = −2

In this case, a unary negation is needed to change the sign:

−(−2) = +2

Trigonometry
This is because it is possible to provide only one term as input for these functions and retrieve a result. By contrast, binary operations, such as addition, require two different terms to compute a result.

Examples from programming languages

JavaScript
In JavaScript, these operators are unary:
Increment: ++x, x++
Decrement: −−x, x−−
Positive: +x
Negative: −x
Ones' complement: ~x
Logical negation: !x

C family of languages
In the C family of languages, the following operators are unary:

Increment: ++x, x++
Decrement: −−x, x−−
Address: &x
Indirection: *x
Positive: +x
Negative: −x
Ones' complement: ~x
Logical negation: !x
Sizeof: sizeof x, sizeof(type-name)
Cast: (type-name) cast-expression

Unix Shell (Bash)
In the Unix/Linux shell (bash/sh), '$' is a unary operator when used for parameter expansion, replacing the name of a variable by its (sometimes modified) value. For example:

 Simple expansion:  $x
 Complex expansion:  ${#x}

Windows PowerShell
Increment: ++$x, $x++
Decrement: −−$x, $x−−
Positive: +$x
Negative: −$x
Logical negation: !$x
Invoke in current scope: .$x
Invoke in new scope: &$x
Cast: [type-name] cast-expression
Cast: +$x
Array: ,$array

See also
 Binary operation
 Iterated binary operation
 Ternary operation
 Arity
 Operation (mathematics)
 Operator (programming)

References

External links

Elementary algebra
Operators (programming)